Claude Bachand is also the name of a Member of Parliament in Ottawa.

Claude Bachand (born April 6, 1956) is a Canadian politician in the  province of Quebec. Bachand was elected to represent the riding of Arthabaska in the National Assembly of Quebec in the 2008 provincial election. He is a member of the Quebec Liberal Party.

Born in Montreal, Quebec, Bachand obtained a college degree in health sciences at the Cégep de Rosemont in 1976 before obtaining a bachelor's degree at the Université de Sherbrooke in 1979. He worked as a mathematics, physics, and chemistry teacher for 23 years and was also the mayor of the municipality of Saint-Norbert d'Arthabaska in the Centre-du-Québec region of southeastern Quebec from 1992 to 2002. He was also a member of various administrative councils in the Bois-Francs and Centre-du-Quebec area.

In 2003, Bachand was first elected at the National Assembly and was the vice-president of the economy and labor commission until his defeat in the 2007 elections. He briefly taught at a Victoriaville high school until he regained the Arthabaska seat in the 2008 elections.

External links
 

1956 births
French Quebecers
Living people
Mayors of places in Quebec
People from Victoriaville
Politicians from Montreal
Quebec Liberal Party MNAs
Université de Sherbrooke alumni
21st-century Canadian politicians